The 1950 Victorian state election was held on 13 May 1950.

Retiring Members
Sir Albert Dunstan (Country, Korong) died before the election; no by-election was held.

Liberal and Country
William Everard MLA (Evelyn)

Country
Matthew Bennett MLA (Gippsland West)

Legislative Assembly
Sitting members are shown in bold text. Successful candidates are highlighted in the relevant colour. Where there is possible confusion, an asterisk (*) is also used.

See also
1949 Victorian Legislative Council election

References

Psephos - Adam Carr's Election Archive

Victoria
Candidates for Victorian state elections